Malacca is a state in Malaysia located in the southern region of the Malay Peninsula, next to the Strait of Malacca. Its capital is Malacca City, dubbed the Historic City, which has been listed as a UNESCO World Heritage Site since 7 July 2008.

The state is bordered by Negeri Sembilan to the north and west and Johor to the south. The exclave of Tanjung Tuan also borders Negeri Sembilan to the north.

Although it was the location of one of the earliest Malay sultanates, namely the Malacca Sultanate, the local monarchy was abolished when the Portuguese conquered it in 1511. The head of state is the Yang di-Pertua Negeri or Governor, rather than a Sultan. Malacca is noted for its unique history and it is one of the major tourist destinations in Malaysia. With a highly strategic state position for international trade routes, Malacca was once a well-known international trade centre in the East. Many traders anchored in Malacca, especially traders from Arabia, China and India, traded at the port of Malacca and from there were born many of the descendants and tribes that exist in Malacca to this day.

A great diversity of races and ethnicities have long existed among the local community reflecting its history. Malays, Chinese, Indians, Baba Nyonya, Kristang, Chitty and Eurasians are significant ethnic groups living in the State of Malacca in the present day.

Etymology
The state's name dates to a popular legend surrounding the founding of the sultanate preceding it by Parameswara who sought to find a new spot to establish his new kingdom after fleeing Singapura fallen by the Majapahit army. As the story goes, Parameswara was resting under a tree near a river during a hunt, when one of his dogs cornered a mouse deer. In self-defence, the mouse deer pushed the dog into the river. Impressed by the courage of the deer, and taking it as a propitious omen of the weak overcoming the powerful, Parameswara decided then and there to found an empire on that very spot. He named it 'Malacca' after the tree where he had just taken shelter at, the Malacca tree. This story shows remarkable similarities with and was probably adapted (as some historians argued) from folk-tales from Kandy, Sri Lanka, and Pasai, Sumatra (both of which pre-date Malacca).

The "Malacca tree" was taken as a basis for the species Phyllanthus emblica named by Carl Linnaeus in 1753 through Latinising its original Sanskrit name  amalaka, to which the species have since been planted as ornamentals in various state attractions. However, some researchers like those of the Forestry Research Institute of Malaysia speculate that the legendary name-giving tree may have been the species Phyllanthus pectinatus more endemic to Malay Archipelago forests which does resemble P. emblica superficially yet both it and the latter have no geographical overlap between them.

Another account on the origin of the naming of Malacca elaborates that during the reign of Muhammad Shah (1424–1444), the Arab merchants called the kingdom 'Malakat' (Arabic for 'congregation of merchants') because it was home to many trading communities. One theory suggests, as mentioned in Suma Oriental by Tomé Pires, that it is derived from the Javanese terms melayu or mlayu (to steadily accelerate or to run), to describe the strong current of a river in Sumatra that today bears the name Sungai Melayu ('Melayu river') which was later possibly adopted to be Melaka as denoting a place for the fleeing prince.

History

Sultanate of Malacca 

Before the arrival of the first Sultan, Malacca was a fishing village. Malacca was founded by Parameswara, also known as Iskandar Shah. He found his way to Malacca around 1402 where he found a good port—it was accessible in all seasons and on the strategically located narrowest point of the Malacca Straits. In collaboration with allies from wandering proto-Malay privateers of the Straits called the orang laut  ("sea-people"), he established Malacca as an international port by compelling passing ships to call there, and establishing fair and reliable facilities for warehousing and trade.

In 1403, the first official Chinese trade envoy led by Admiral Yin Qing arrived in Malacca. Later, Parameśwara was escorted by Zheng He and other envoys in his successful visits. Malacca's relationships with Ming China granted it protection from attacks by Siam and Majapahit. Malacca officially submitted to Ming China as a protectorate. This encouraged the development of Malacca into a major trade settlement on the trade route between China and India, Middle East, Africa and Europe.

In Malacca during the early 15th century, Ming China actively sought to develop a commercial hub and a base of operation for their treasure voyages into the Indian Ocean. Malacca had been a relatively insignificant region, not even qualifying as a polity prior to the voyages according to both Ma Huan and Fei Xin, and was a vassal region of Siam. In 1405, the Ming court dispatched Admiral Zheng He with a stone tablet enfeoffing the Western Mountain of Malacca as well as an imperial order elevating the status of the port to a country. The Chinese also established a government depot (官廠) as a fortified cantonment for their soldiers. Ma Huan reported that Siam did not dare to invade Malacca thereafter. The rulers of Malacca, such as Parameswara in 1411, would pay tribute to the Chinese emperor in person. In 1431, when a Malaccan representative complained that Siam was obstructing tribute missions to the Ming court, the Xuande Emperor dispatched Zheng He carrying a threatening message for the Siamese king saying "You, king should respect my orders, develop good relations with your neighbours, examine and instruct your subordinates and not act recklessly or aggressively." The early kings of Malacca—Parameswara, Megat Iskandar Shah, and Sri Maharaja—understood that they could gain Ming China's protection through skilful diplomacy and thereby could establish a strong foundation to their kingdom against Siam and other potential enemies. Chinese involvement was crucial for Malacca to grow into a key alternative to other important and established ports.

To enhance relations, Hang Li Po, according to local folklore, a daughter of the Ming Emperor of China, arrived in Malacca, accompanied by 500 attendants, to marry Sultan Manshur Shah who reigned from 1456 until 1477. Her attendants married locals and settled mostly in Bukit Cina. 

"In the 9th month of the year 1481 envoys arrived with the [......] Malacca again sent envoys to China in 1481 to inform the Chinese that, while Malaccan envoys were returning to Malacca from China in 1469, the Vietnamese attacked the Malaccans, killing some of them while castrating the young and enslaving them. The Malaccans reported that Vietnam was in control of Champa and also sought to conquer Malacca, but the Malaccans did not fight back, because they did not want to fight against another state that was a tributary to China without permission from the Chinese. They requested to confront the Vietnamese delegation to China which was in China at the time, but the Chinese informed them since the incident was years old, they could do nothing about it, and the Emperor sent a letter to the Vietnamese ruler reproaching him for the incident. The Chinese Emperor also ordered the Malaccans to raise soldiers and fight back with violent force if the Vietnamese attacked them again.

Colonial era

In April 1511, Alfonso de Albuquerque set sail from Goa to Malacca with a force of some 1200 men and seventeen or eighteen ships. They conquered the city on 24 August 1511. After seizing the city Afonso de Albuquerque spared the Hindu, Chinese and Burmese inhabitants but had the Muslim inhabitants massacred or sold into slavery.

It soon became clear that Portuguese control of Malacca did not also mean that they controlled the Asian trade centred there. The Malaccan rule was severely hampered by administrative and economic difficulties. Rather than achieving their ambition of dominating Asian trade, the Portuguese had disrupted the organisation of the network. The centralised port of exchange of Asian wealth had now gone, as was a Malay state to police the Straits of Malacca that made it safe for commercial traffic. Trade was now scattered over a number of ports among bitter warfare in the Straits.

The Jesuit missionary Francis Xavier spent several months in Malacca in 1545, 1546, and 1549. The Dutch launched several attacks on the Portuguese colony during the first four decades of the seventeenth century. The first attack took place in 1606 under the command of Dutch Admiral Cornelis Matelief de Jonge who laid siege to the town with the help of his Johor allies. He engaged the Portuguese armada which had been sent from Goa to offer armed relief to the besieged port. On 14 January 1641, the Dutch defeated the Portuguese in an effort to capture Malacca, with the help of the Sultan of Johor. The Dutch ruled Malacca from 1641 to 1798 but they were not interested in developing it as a trading centre, placing greater importance on Batavia (Jakarta) and Java as their administrative centre. However they still built their landmark, better known as the Stadthuys. In the Dutch era the building was white, the red paint is of later date.

Malacca was ceded to the British in the Anglo-Dutch Treaty of 1824 in exchange for Bencoolen on Sumatra. From 1824 to 1942, Malacca was under the rule of the British, first by the British East India Company and then as a crown colony. Due to dissatisfaction with British jurisdiction over Naning, Dol Said, a local chief, fought the East India Company in a war from 1831 to 1832, which resulted in a decisive British victory. It formed part of the Straits Settlements, together with Singapore and Penang. Malacca went briefly under the rule of Empire of Japan in 1942–1945 during World War II.

Post colonial era
After the dissolution of this crown colony, Malacca and Penang became part of the Malayan Union on 1 April 1946, which later became the Federation of Malaya on 1 February 1948. The declaration of independence was made by the first Prime Minister of Malaya, Tunku Abdul Rahman, at Padang Pahlawan on 20 February 1956, which eventually led to the independence of Malaya on 31 August 1957. On 16 September 1963, Malaysia was formed with the merger of Malaya with Sabah, Sarawak and Singapore, and Malacca became part of it. On 15 April 1989, Malacca was declared a historical city. It was then also listed as UNESCO World Heritage Site since 7 July 2008.

Geography

It sits upon the southwestern coast of the Malay Peninsula opposite Sumatra, with the state of Negeri Sembilan to the north and west and Johor to the east. With the exception of some of its small hills, Malacca is generally a lowland area with average elevation below 50 meters above sea level.

The peninsula of Tanjung Tuan (formerly known as Cape Rachado) is an exclave of the state, situated on the coast of Negeri Sembilan which it borders to the north. The major rivers within Malacca include the Malacca, Linggi and Kesang rivers. Malacca River (Sungai Melaka) roughly runs through the centre line of the state from north to south, Linggi River acts as the western border of Malacca with Negeri Sembilan, while Kesang River acts as the eastern border of Malacca with Johor. Malacca has thirteen islands off its coast, with Besar Island being the biggest of all.

Climate
The climate of Malacca is hot and humid throughout the year with abundant rainfall, highest between September and November.

Urban and suburban areas

Government

Malacca is one of only four Malaysian states without hereditary monarchies, despite being the location of one of the earliest Malay sultanates, as the local monarchy was abolished when the Portuguese conquered it in 1511. The head of state of Malacca is the Governor, who is appointed by the King of Malaysia. The present Governor of Malacca, Ali Rustam, assumed office on 4 June 2020. In practice, the Governor is a figurehead whose functions are chiefly symbolic and ceremonial.

The Malacca state government has its own executive council and legislature, but they have relatively limited powers in comparison with those of the Malaysian federal government. According to the Malaysian Federal Constitution, the state may legislate on matters pertaining to Malay customs, land, agriculture and forestry, local government, civil and water works, and state administration, whereas matters that fall under the joint purview of both state and federal authorities include social welfare, wildlife protection and national parks, scholarships, husbandry, town planning, drainage and irrigation, and public health and health regulations.

Executive and Legislature

Malacca's state legislature is the unicameral 28-seat State Legislative Assembly, the highest authority in the state which decides on policy matters. The State Executive Council is responsible to the assembly and comprises members who are appointed every five years by the political party or coalition in power.

The State Government is headed by the Chief Minister, appointed by Yang di-Pertua Negeri from among the State Legislative Assembly members of the governing party or coalition. The Chief Minister presides over a meeting of State Executive Council ministers weekly at the Chief Minister's office. The Chief Minister's Department is responsible for the overall administration of the state, as well as its political interest. The current Chief Minister is Sulaiman Md Ali from the United Malays National Organisation (UMNO).

The administrative complex is located at Seri Negeri complex in Ayer Keroh. It houses the Chief Minister's office, the State Legislative Assembly, the State Secretariat office and the official residence of the Governor.

Departments 
 Malacca State Treasury and Finance Department
 Malacca State Mufti Department
 Malacca Syariah Judiciary Department
 Office of Lands and Mines Malacca
 Malacca Town and Country Planning Department
 Malacca Islamic Religious Affairs Department
 Malacca Irrigation and Drainage Department
 Malacca Public Works Department
 Malacca Social Welfare Department
 Malacca State Agriculture Department
 Malacca Veterinary Services Department
 Malacca State Forestry Department

Statutory bodies 
 Malacca State Development Corporation
 Malacca Customary Land Development Corporation
 Malacca Foundation
 Malacca Museum Corporation
 Malacca Public Library Corporation
 Malacca Islamic Religious Council
 Malacca Biotechnology Corporation
 Malacca Green Technology Corporation
 Malacca River And Coastal Development Corporation
 Malacca Housing Board

Local governments

Malacca has four local governments (one city council and three municipal councils), which regulating traffic and parking, maintaining cleanliness and drainage, managing waste disposal, issuing business licenses, and overseeing public health, provision and maintenance of urban infrastructure. The state is also divided into three administrative districts, each is headed by a district officer. The lands and district office in each district deals with land administration and revenue.

 Historical Malacca City Council administers most of Melaka Tengah District.
 Alor Gajah Municipal Council administers most of Alor Gajah District.
 Jasin Municipal Council administers most of Jasin District.
 Hang Tuah Jaya Municipal Council is in charge of Hang Tuah Jaya municipality, which consists of the northern part of Melaka Tengah District, the southeastern part of Alor Gajah District and the western part of Jasin District.

Economy

Despite being located in a land without any significant natural resources, the economy of Malacca dates back more than 500 years, due to its strategic location. As the centre of the all important spice trade, Malacca attracted many colonial powers to engage wars to control it.

Port of Tanjung Bruas, located in Tanjung Kling, was constructed in late 1970s and commenced operations in early 1980s to provide port facilities and services to the local business communities and to handle the exportation of hinterland goods as well as the importation of raw materials. Container ship handling services began in 2019, with MV West Scent became the first container vessel to dock at the port.

Port of Kuala Sungai Linggi, commercially known as Linggi International Floating Transshipment & Trading HUB (LIFT-HUB), is a transshipment area for liquid bulk transshipments and break-bulking located offshore of Linggi River in the Strait of Malacca. It was gazetted in 2006, covers an area of 154 km2 (45 sq mi) and is among the largest designated Ship-to-ship cargo transfer area in Malaysia.

Sungai Udang houses the PETRONAS Malacca Refinery Complex consisting two refining trains, established in 1994 and 1999 and owned by PETRONAS Penapisan (Melaka) Sdn. Bhd. and Malaysian Refining Company Sdn. Bhd. respectively. The total capacity of the refinery is 270,000 barrels of oil per day.

The Melaka International Trade Centre (MITC) in Ayer Keroh which was opened in June 2003 is the leading commercial centre and the centre for meetings, incentives, conferencing and exhibitions (MICE) which plays an important role in the development of trade in Malacca.

On 20 October 2010 an event was held to announce that Malacca had met the benchmark of 'Developed State' as set out by the Organisation for Economic Co-operation and Development and a declaration of "Melaka Maju 2010" (Progressive Malacca 2010) was made.

, service sector contributes to the largest share of economy in Malacca accounted for 46.9%, followed by manufacturing (43.5%), agriculture (6.5%), construction (2.9%) and mining (0.1%). In terms of number of workforce, there were 275,000 people working in the industrial sectors, 225,000 people working in the service sectors, 35,000 people working in the entrepreneurship sectors and 12,300 people working in the agricultural sectors.

Malacca has successfully opened itself up to foreign investors since the early 1970s. By 1997, the state has registered a total investment of over MYR16 billion. In 2014, the state achieved a total MYR4.4 billion worth of investment, in which MYR1.8 billion came from foreign investors.

In 2013, Malacca had a GDP of MYR22,646 million with GDP per capita of MYR34,109. It had 3.2% GDP growth in 2013. Inflation rate in 2012 was 1.6%. , the Malacca State Government has an outstanding MYR861.7 million of loan to the federal government. In 2014, the state government's reserve amounted to MYR206.61 million. The unemployment rate in 2014 was 0.9% or around 3,500 people. The state has a relatively well-educated population, with a youth literacy rate of 99.5% as reported by Malaysia Millennium Development Goals Report 2015.

Currently there are 23 industrial areas which are centred along the edges of the city proper in suburbs which include Ayer Keroh, Batu Berendam, Cheng, Taman Tasik Utama and Tanjung Kling. While outside Malacca City, industrial areas include Alor Gajah and Sungai Udang. There are around 500 factories in the state which come from Germany, Japan, Singapore, Taiwan, United States etc. For small and medium-sized enterprises, a number of estates have been established by the state government.

In 2016, Malacca became the safest place to live in Malaysia. The state crime rates dropped by 15.5 per cent in 2017 with 3,096 cases recorded compared to 3,663 in 2016. Malacca recorded a gross domestic product (GDP) growth of 8.1% in 2017, the second highest in the country after Sabah. Services sector remained the main contributor to the state’s economy at 44.8% of GDP. The GDP per capita also expanded 11.2% to RM46,015 in 2017, surpassing the national-level figure of RM42,228. The State Socioeconomic Report 2017 published on 26 July 2018 reported that Malacca was the state that recorded the lowest unemployment rate in 2017 with only 1.0 percent.

Energy

Power generation
Malacca houses three power stations, namely the 330 MW Tanjung Kling Power Station in Tanjung Kling and 440 MW Telok Gong Power Station 1 and 720 MW Telok Gong Power Station 2 in Telok Gong, with a total installed generation capacity of 1,490 MW.

Green energy
On 16 December 2013, the Malacca State Government unveiled the draft 8,000 hectares special area called the Melaka World Solar Valley in Rembia, Alor Gajah applying solar energy as the primary alternative in all municipal activity sectors.

By 2020, the government-run 7,248ha Melaka World Solar Valley aims to power most of the daily activities of manufacturers, housing developers, farmers, and other stakeholders. Recently, a public-private partnership installed 100,000 LED street lamps along the Alor Gajah–Melaka Tengah–Jasin (AMJ) highway, which will improve road safety and reduce carbon dioxide emissions.

Water supply
Water supply-related matters in Malacca is administered by Syarikat Air Melaka Berhad (Malacca Water Company Limited) which is headquartered at Malacca City. It was established on 1 July 2006 after it was upgraded from its predecessor Malacca Water Corporation. The company is also responsible for the maintenance and delivery infrastructure of clean water in the state.

Currently, there are three dams located in Malacca supplying its residents with water, which are Durian Tunggal Dam in Alor Gajah, Jus Dam and Asahan Dam in Jasin. The fourth dam, Jernih Dam, will be constructed in Taboh Naning in Alor Gajah and expected to be completed by 2018. There are three major retention basins in the state, which are Kesang Satu Lake, Kesang Dua Lake and Ayer Keroh Lake. Raw water is supplied from the Malacca River, Kesang River and Gerisik River.

Daily water consumption for Malacca is 500 million litres and each resident consumes 220 litres per day, higher than the national average of 180 litres per day. The Malacca State Government signed an agreement with Johor State Government on a water supply agreement in 1993 and additional water supply agreement in 2013. Another water supply agreement is planned to be signed with Negeri Sembilan in the future.

Demographics

Malacca has an estimated population of 931,210  with an average annual population growth of 2%. , 27% of the population aged below 15 years old and 8% aged above 60 years old. The ethnic composition of Malacca as of 2015 is 66.8% Malays (552,700), 1.4% other Bumiputras (11,500), 26.0% Chinese (215,000), 6.2% Indians and Chitty (51,400) and 0.6% others (4,800). Malacca has small communities of Kristang, Dutch Eurasian and Temuan people.

Malay community in Malacca is generally divided into two, which are the Temenggong custom and the Perpatih custom. The remaining traditional Malay village in Malacca City is the Morten Village.

Jonker Walk is the Chinatown area of Malacca. It was once known for its antique shops but have since turned into a well-known tourist destination that features clothes, food and crafts. The Peranakan people in Malacca show unique features, such as furniture, porcelain, crockery, style and food. Their culture is showcased at the Baba Nyonya Heritage Museum.

Indians in Malacca are predominantly Tamils, many of whom used to work at the rubber plantation. However, many of them now work in the jewellery, fabrics, retailers, merchants and money lender sectors. Many of them reside in Little India. There is also Chitty Village for the minority Chitty people which houses the Chitty Museum.

Besides, small number of Malayalees who speak Malayalam and Telugus who speak Telugu exist among the Indians in Malacca. Malacca Kerala Samajam is an association that represents the Malayalam speaking community in Malacca. A branch of Telugu Association Malaysia is situated in Ayer Keroh to represent the Telugu speaking community in Malacca.

A sizeable number of Punjabi Sikhs residing in Malacca, and Sikhs from Malacca and abroad congregate in the gurdwara (Sikh temple) situated in Jalan Temenggong. They celebrate the Guru Nanak's birthday and Vasakhi new year annually.

A population of Portuguese descent, who speak a Portuguese creole, are the descendants of colonists from the 16th and 17th centuries. Even to this day, many of the traditions originating with the Portuguese occupation are still practised, i.e. "Intrudu" from Portuguese word "Entrudo" (a water festival that marks the beginning of Lent, the Catholic fasting period), "branyu" (traditional dance), "Santa Cruz" (a yearly Festival of street celebrations). Many of them settle down around the Portuguese Settlement area, which has a population of about 1,200 residents.

The indigenous people, mostly ethnic Temuan is relatively small. They generally reside in rural settlements, the edge of the woods and along the coast facing Malacca Strait. Malacca houses the Aborigines Museum in Ayer Keroh.

Language
Malacca is a multi-linguistic state. Malaysian is the official language of Malacca and is used in the government and public sectors. English is widely used in the business and tourism sectors. A local Malay, known as Malaccan Malay is a unique variety of Malay spoken within the state of Malacca. It has its own distinct pronunciation and vocabulary compared to the rest of Malaysia. Other minority languages such as Hokkien, Mandarin, Tamil, Malayalam, Telugu, Punjabi, Kristang (Portuguese creole) and various Malay-based creoles such as Baba Malay and Malaccan Creole Malay are also spoken. The Temuan language is commonly spoken by Orang Asli within Malacca.

Religion

According to the 2010 census, the population of Malacca is 66.1% Muslim, 24.2% Buddhist, 5.7% Hindu, 3.0% Christian, 0.4% of unknown affiliation, 0.2% non-religious, 0.2% Taoist or Chinese religion follower, and 0.2% of followers of other religions.

Statistics from the 2010 Census indicate that 91.6% of the Chinese population in Malacca are identified as Buddhists, with significant minorities of adherents identifying as Christians (6.7%), Chinese folk religions (0.7%) and Muslims (0.4%). The majority of the Indian population are Hindus (86.3%), with a significant minorities of numbers identifying as Christians (6.6%), Muslims (3.4%) and Buddhists (2.8%). The non-Malay bumiputera community are predominantly Christians (46.8%), with significant minorities identifying as Muslims (24.2%) and Buddhists (12.0%).

As the definition of a "Malay" in the Malaysian constitution requires that the person professes the religion of Islam, all Malays are necessarily Muslims.

Education

Primary and secondary education

Up to 2018, there are 237 primary schools and 77 secondary schools in Malacca. Sekolah Jenis Kebangsaan (C) Yok Bin, Sekolah Kebangsaan Convent Of The Infant Jesus (2), Sekolah Kebangsaan (P) Methodist (2) and Sekolah Kebangsaan Convent Of The Infant Jesus (1) is the high performance primary school in Malacca while for secondary school is Sekolah Menengah Sains Muzaffar Syah (MOZAC), Sekolah Berasrama Penuh Integrasi Selandar and Sekolah Menengah Kebangsaan Agama Sharifah Rodziah. The Malacca High School is one of the premier schools in Malaysia and is the second oldest recorded school in the country after Penang Free School in Penang. The Ministry of Education of Malaysia enrolls students based on their Ujian Penilaian Sekolah Rendah (UPSR) and Pentaksiran Tingkatan 3 (PT3). One branch of centre for juvenile convicts, Henry Gurney School, is located in Telok Mas. This centre runs rehabilitation programs for male juvenile offenders.

Malacca has four international schools – the KYS International School, Melaka International School, Malacca Expatriate School (MES) and UUM International School Melaka, staffed by expatriate teachers, which specialise in teaching Cambridge International A Levels and cater for both the local and  expatriate communities.

Higher education

Institutions include:
Universiti Teknikal Malaysia Melaka (UTeM).
Universiti Teknologi MARA (UiTM) campuses that are located at Lendu, Malacca City and Jasin.
Manipal University College Malaysia (MUCM) in Bukit Baru is the foremost institution for medical education in the state.
Multimedia University (MMU) at Bukit Beruang.
Malaysian Maritime Academy (ALAM) at Kuala Sungai Baru.
Malaysian Han Studies (MAHANS) at Hang Tuah Jaya.

There are several institutions that offer nursing education: Institut Kesihatan Sains & Kejururawatan Pantai, Institut Sains Kesihatan Dan Kejururawatan Mahkota, Kolej Kejururawatan & Kesihatan Nilam, and Kolej Perubatan Komplementari Melaka. Institut Kesihatan Sains & Kejururawatan Pantai is linked to Pantai Hospital at Ayer keroh while Institut Sains Kesihatan Dan Kejururawatan Mahkota is linked to Mahkota Medical Centre.

Skill-Tech Institute provides training in agriculture, homestay, biotechnology, ranching, aquaculture, estate supervision, landscaping, and food processing. It has two branches in Machap, Durian Tunggal and Taman Tasik Utama, Ayer Keroh.

Part-time study is available at Open University Malaysia (OUM), while those who wish to obtain an academic diploma can enroll at University of Malaya Centre for Continuing Education (UMCCE) at Sinar College.

Association of Chartered Certified Accountants (ACCA) lectures and examinations are provided at Sinar College at Malacca City. Sinar College is the only institution in the state that offers complete accounting education. Sinar College is the only approved training centre for tourism courses. Other academic institutions include International College of Yayasan Melaka (ICYM) and Melaka International College of Science and Technology (MiCoST).

The state government of Malacca provides financial assistance mainly in the form of loans to local citizens via Malacca Education Trust Fund (TAPEM). Among the facilities provided by TAPEM are Higher Education Loan, Minor Scholarship/Incentive Scholarship for Secondary School, and School Assistance to Primary School Students.

Public libraries

The very first library in Malacca was the Khutub Khanah Melaka (later renamed Henry Gurney Memorial Library), which was established in 1881 and was located at the Stadthuys. The library was moved to Hang Tuah Hall in 1966 and renamed the Malacca Library. In 1975, the Malacca Public Library Corporation Bill was enacted to establish the Malacca Public Library Corporation (PERPUSTAM). The corporation headquartered in the main library, was later established in 1977, with the enforcement of the Enactment which was amended in 1993. The main library moved again to its current location at Bukit Baru, which was inaugurated on 4 November 1996.

Apart from the main library, there are also public libraries at district level, as well as town and village levels.

Health care

Malacca houses a number of government and private hospitals and health clinics, as well as hundreds of private clinics. The location of medical institutions are located all over the state of Malacca, either in urban or rural areas, providing uniform and equitable healthcare to the residents. Health-related affairs in Malacca is governed by Malacca State Health Department by providing basic health service to the residents and oversee all government health facilities in the state among hospitals, community polyclinic, rural health clinics and clinics.

Malacca is also a popular place for health care and medical tourism for Indonesian people from Sumatra due to its close proximity to the state, followed by Singapore. In 2014, Malacca received over 500,000 tourists for medical tourism-related purpose.

Government hospitals in Malacca are Malacca General Hospital and Jasin District Hospital, while private hospitals are Putra Hospital, Pantai Hospital Ayer Keroh, Mahkota Medical Centre and Oriental Melaka Straits Medical Centre.

Culture
Each group upholds their tradition and it is reflected in their food, religion customs, festivals, culture, design, application, jewellery and handicrafts. Among the unique Malacca culture is Dondang Sayang which is recognized by UNESCO. Dondang Sayang is a traditional Malay art still practised in Malacca by four communities: the Malay, Baba Nyonya, Chitty and Portuguese communities. The practice combines elements of music (violins, gongs and tambourines or the tambour), songs and chants, and features melodious strains of poetry. Also known as love ballads, the songs are used by communities to convey feelings of love and give advice on special topics such as love and kindness. For food, Malacca received recognition from the World Street Food Congress for Nyonya Siamese Noodles (34th) and Coolie Street Satay (43rd). The various street dishes and delicacies of Malacca include (but not limited to) satay celup; chicken rice balls; duck noodles; Malacca-style wonton noodles; nyonya laksa; pai tee (also known as pie tee and top hats); ayam pongteh; asam pedas with fish; Portuguese grilled fish and seafood; fishball lobak; coconut shake; nyonya cendol; putu piring; and nyonya kuih.

Street art 
Penang started the street art trend in Malaysia and Malacca soon followed suit with their River Art Project in 2012. Water has always been a big part of Malacca’s history. It was once one of the world’s most important trading ports, so it also makes sense that Malacca start the street art with the buildings beside the river. To boost the art landscape in Malacca, nine artists came together to paint their works on the walls of historical shophouses along the river in Jalan Kampung Hulu. Known as ProjectARM, these artworks are designed to highlight the beauty of Malacca. The murals depict the artists representation of Malacca and include a colourful mosaic painted on the walls of Kiehl’s store.

Sports

Sports-related affairs of Malacca are governed by the Malacca State Sports Council under the Malacca State Government. Another governing body of sports in Malacca is the Department of Youth and Sports. Malacca is home to several football stadiums, such as Hang Jebat Stadium, Hang Tuah Stadium and Tun Fatimah Stadium. Built in 1954, Hang Tuah Stadium is the oldest stadium in Malacca. Established under the Malacca Stadium Corporation Enactment of 2004, the Malacca Stadium Corporation is the entity that manages stadiums in Malacca which started its operation on 16 September 2004.

There is also a motorsport racetrack in Durian Tunggal named the Melaka International Motorsport Circuit. Melaka International Bowling Centre in Ayer Keroh with 52 lanes is the largest bowling centre in Malaysia.

There are four golf courses in Malacca, namely Ayer Keroh Golf and Country Club in Ayer Keroh, Orna Golf and Country Club in Bemban and Tiara Melaka Golf and Country Club in Bukit Katil and A'Famosa Golf Resort in Simpang Ampat. Golf-related paraphernalia in Malacca is showcased at the Malacca Golf Gallery.

Malacca was the host venue for the 2010 Sukma Games held on 10–19 June 2010.

Malacca also has a football team known as Melaka United representing Malacca in the Malaysian football league. The Melaka United football team won the first Malaysia Premier League title in 1983, in addition they were the champion of the third division of the Malaysia football league, FAM League Cup, in 2015 before won the second Premier League title a year after it. Melaka United uses the Hang Jebat Stadium in Krubong as their home ground with a capacity of 40,000 spectators.

Tourism

Tourism is a booming industry in Malacca. It is a popular travel destinations for Singaporeans during the weekends. Malacca has adopted as its slogan, "Visiting Malacca Means Visiting Malaysia" ("Melawat Melaka Bererti Melawati Malaysia"). There is a tourist map provided by Malacca.

In 2017, the state recorded 16.79 million tourist arrivals, the highest number to date. Despite been a small state spanning 1,644 km2, Malacca has been a destination of choice for travellers from China, Singapore, Indonesia, Taiwan and Hong Kong. During the first six months (January–June) 2018, over 8.73 million tourists were recorded visiting Malacca which is over seven percent compared to 8.14 million tourists for the first six months of 2017. It showed an increase of 599,037 tourists. The increase was contributed by the increase of domestic tourists to Malacca which was more than 72,000 or 1.36 percent. For domestic tourists, five states reportedly visited the most are from Selangor, Kuala Lumpur, Johor, Terengganu and Negeri Sembilan. Most of these tourists love to enjoy grilled fish and asam pedas in Malacca. In addition, foreign tourist arrivals also experienced a sharp increase of more than 520,000 or 19.03 percent. Travellers from five countries recorded the highest rates are China, Singapore, Indonesia, South Korea and Vietnam.

In recent years, Malacca has received numerous international accolades. The city has been listed by several publications, including Forbes and Lonely Planet, as one of Asia's and World's Top Travel Destinations. Malacca listed as one of 10 Best Destinations in Malaysia by Tripadvisor. Waze App recognized Malacca with 'The Best City to Drive In' Award. Globally, the historic city is ranked ahead of other major metros like Sydney, Lisbon, and Barcelona. The city also has been recognised by HuffPost as 15 of the Best Street Art Cities. In addition, Time publication placed Malacca as one of the best places to live and retire.

Tourist attractions

Malacca has numerous historical places and buildings. In order to preserve those sites, numerous museums have been built to preserve those legacies. Most of the museums in the state are managed by Malacca Museum Corporation (PERZIM). Museums in Malacca are Aborigines Museum, Agricultural Museum, Malacca Al-Quran Museum, Baba Nyonya Heritage Museum, Beauty Museum, Cheng Ho Cultural Museum, Chitty Museum, Customs Department Museum, Democratic Government Museum, Education Museum, Malacca Forestry Museum, Governor's Museum, History and Ethnography Museum, Malacca Islamic Museum, Malacca Kite Museum, Malacca Literature Museum, Malacca Sultanate Palace Museum, Malay and Islamic World Museum, Malaysia Architecture Museum, Maritime Museum, Navy Museum, People's Museum, Prison Museum, Pulau Besar Museum, Stamp Museum, Straits Chinese Jewellery Museum, Submarine Museum, Toy Museum, Tradition and Custom Museum, UMNO Museum and Youth Museum.

The other historical buildings and structures are Fortress of Malacca, Alor Gajah British Graveyard, Bastion Middleburg, Dutch Graveyard, Hang Jebat Mausoleum, Hang Kasturi Mausoleum, Hang Li Poh's Well, Hang Tuah Mausoleum, Hang Tuah's Well, Malacca Light, Malacca Warrior Monument, Portuguese Well, Proclamation of Independence Memorial, Ruins of Saint Paul's Church, Saint John's Fort, Stadthuys, Tun Abdul Ghafar Baba Memorial and Tun Teja Mausoleum.

There are also galleries displaying various aspects of life in Malacca, which include, Chief Minister’s Gallery, Demang Abdul Ghani Gallery, Folks Art Gallery, Malacca Gallery, Gallery of Admiral Cheng Ho, Macau Gallery, Malacca Art Gallery, Melaka Bee Gallery and Malacca House.

Theme parks, education centres, resorts and zoos in Malacca are A' Famosa Resort, Al-Khawarizmi Astronomy Complex, Malacca Bird Park, Malacca Butterfly and Reptile Sanctuary, Malacca Crocodile Farm, Malacca Planetarium, Malacca Wonderland, Malacca Zoo, Mini Malaysia and ASEAN Cultural Park, Pirate Park and Taming Sari Tower.

Malacca has natural-related tourist sites, such as Ayer Keroh Lake, Bukit Batu Lebah Recreational Forest, Cape Rachado, Garden of Thousand Flowers, Klebang Beach, Malacca Botanical Garden, Malacca River, Malacca Tropical Fruit Farm, Paya Laut Linggi Recreational Forest, Pengkalan Balak Beach, Puteri Beach, Saint Paul's Hill and Sungai Udang Recreational Forest. Malacca has also hot springs, namely Gadek Hot Spring and Jasin Hot Spring.

Malacca is a multi-religious society, therefore various worshiping places can be found around the state, namely Cheng Hoon Teng Temple, Chinese Mosque, Christ Church, Kampung Hulu Mosque, Kampung Kling Mosque, Poh San Teng Temple, Xiang Lin Si Temple, Saint Francis Xavier Church, Saint Peter's Church, Straits Mosque, Sri Poyatha Moorthi Temple, State Mosque and Tranquerah Mosque.

Public squares in Malacca are 1Malaysia Square, Alor Gajah Square, Ayer Keroh Square and Jasin Square.

Some night markets can be found along Jonker Walk in Chinatown during weekends evening and along Puteri Beach in Tanjung Kling. In total, there are around 87 night markets around Malacca. During the Islamic fasting month, special night markets are opened along many major roads throughout the month.

International relations

Cultural exchanges

China

In June 2012, the Macau Gallery was opened at Peringgit, Malacca by the government of Macau. In April 2015, the Malacca State Government decided to build the MYR300 million Malacca Information Centre which will be located in Zhuhai, Guangdong.

Cuba

In June 2007, a gallery named Casa Cuba was opened in Peringgit under the initiative of the Cuban embassy in Kuala Lumpur and situated in the former senior government officer's residence during British Malaya. The gallery showcases various forms of art by Cuban artists, such as paintings, lithographs and ceramics.

Indonesia

In February 2013, the Melaka Gallery in Jakarta, Indonesia was officiated by Jakarta Governor Joko Widodo and Malacca Chief Minister Mohd Ali Rustam.

Twin towns and friendship cities

Malacca first started twinning in 1984 with the city of Lisbon, Portugal and it is now twinned with or established as a friendship city with the following cities:

Transportation

Air
Malacca International Airport (IATA: MKZ, ICAO: WMKM) (formerly known as Batu Berendam Airport) is an airport located in Batu Berendam, Malacca, Malaysia. The airport serves the state of Malacca, as well as northern Johor, with links to Pekanbaru and Penang

Railway
There are currently two Keretapi Tanah Melayu railway stations in Malacca, which are the Pulau Sebang/Tampin Station in Pulau Sebang, Alor Gajah and Batang Melaka Station in Batang Melaka, Jasin.

There were railway tracks from Pulau Sebang to Malacca City before World War II, but these were dismantled by the Japanese for the construction of the Burmese Death Railway. On 10 October 2015, Keretapi Tanah Melayu Berhad (KTMB) commuter service has introduced a new route, shuttle service between Seremban-Sebang/Tampin-Gemas station.

A 1.6-km line of Melaka Monorail was launched in October 2010, served the route along the Malacca River. Due to several technical glitches months into its operation, the system was left idle in 2013. However, in June 2015 the Malacca State Government decided to revive the project. On 4 December 2017, Melaka Monorail has re-operate with enhanced safety features such as lightning-prevention devices and the addition of a rescue vehicle to attract wagons in the event of a technical problem. The previous incident is believed will not recur as tests had been performed for two months before re-operation. The Melaka Monorail operating hours are 10.00 am to 10.00 pm on weekdays and continued until 12.00 midnight on Saturdays and Sundays.

Water
Daily ferries run from Malacca to the Indonesian cities of Bengkalis, Dumai and Pekanbaru departing from Harbour Master's Jetty. Regular boat services to Big Island depart from mainland Malacca in Umbai. Several jetties around the state, such as in Merlimau, are used by fishermen.

Two existing container ports in Malacca are the Port of Kuala Sungai Linggi and Port of Tanjung Bruas.

Road
Travelling to Malacca by bus is favored by most people. This is because Malacca is well connected to the PLUS highway via three major exits. The Ayer Keroh exit at the North–South Expressway is the main entry to Malacca, connected by Ayer Keroh highway to Malacca City. There are two additional exits along the North–South Expressway, namely the Simpang Ampat and Jasin exits. The Syed Abdullah Aziz Road or Malacca Coastal Highway roughly connects the western and eastern sides of Malacca separated by the Malacca River through the Malacca Coastal Bridge. It is also easy to access Malacca by bus because Malacca has three main bus hubs such as Melaka Sentral, Alor Gajah Sentral and Jasin Sentral. The location of the bus stations are based on their districts, Melaka Tengah, Alor Gajah and Jasin. The Melaka Sentral bus station, combined with taxi terminal, serves cities around Peninsular Malaysia and Singapore. The Panorama Melaka bus is the public bus serving Malacca City and major landmarks.

Efforts are also being undertaken to promote pedestrianisation and the use of bicycles as an environmentally friendly mode of transportation. Dedicated bicycle lanes are being built on several main roads in this historic city.

Many of the heavily decorated cycle rickshaws (Malay: beca) equipped with sound system can be seen on the streets in Malacca. Most of them are used to bring tourist around the town for sightseeing. The average size can accommodate two average adult with probably a child.

Media

Art of culture and entertainment
Malacca is a popular filming location for domestic and international film production companies with the presence of various tourist attractions and historical remains. Iconic Bollywood artist, Shah Rukh Khan described Malacca as beautiful and said he would return for acting and holiday in the state. The films and the music videos published in Malacca include:

 1987 - Tragic Hero, starring Andy Lau. Part of this Hong Kong movie was filmed in Malacca.
 1999 - Entrapment, starring Sean Connery, Catherine Zeta-Jones and Kee Thuan Chye, Malaysian actor. Part of the Hollywood movie was shot at Malacca River.
 2001 - One 2 Ka 4, starring Shah Rukh Khan, Juhi Chawla and Jackie Shroff.
 2008 - Singaporean drama series The Little Nyonya, starring Jeanette Aw and Qi Yuwu.
 2011 - Don 2, starring Shah Rukh Khan and Priyanka Chopra. Malacca Prison were among the filming set of the Bollywood movie.
 2013 - Suami Aku Ustaz, starring Ady Putra, Nora Danish and Izzue Islam. The filming is fully carried out at several locations in Malacca.
 2016 - Kabali, starring Rajinikanth. Malacca Contingent Police Headquarters and Sungai Udang Prison were filming sites for Kollywood.
 2016 - Ayda Jebat's Pencuri Hati music video (dangdut version).
 2017 - Malaysian drama series Hikayat Cinta Si Pematah Hati, starring Alif Satar.
 2018 - Malaysian telemovie Aku Nazmi starring Jay Iswazir, Ayda Jebat and Sheila Rusly
 2018 - Malaysian drama series Mr. Grey, starring Fendi Bakry.
 2021 - Mechamato is a Malaysian animation series which set in a fictional city inspired from Malacca City.

Radio 
The available FM radio stations in Malacca, both government (including Malacca-based Melaka FM) and commercial, are as listed below.

Notable people 

Experts and Academicians
Shirley Geok-lin Lim, award-winning novelist, writer and Professor of English at the University of California, Santa Barbara.
Suhaimi Sulaiman, news anchor and experienced media strategist in Malaysia.
Tan Sri Dato' Sri Ahmad Maarop, tenth President of the Court of Appeal of Malaysia.

Film, Television and Music
Amar Asyraf, actor.
Anuar Zain, singer and a multi award-winning artist.
Aubrey Suwito, Malaysian pianist, keyboardist, songwriter, arranger and producer.
Christopher Lee, actor.
Remy Ishak, actor.
Resh or Reshmonu, singer-songwriter.
Ziana Zain, pop singer-songwriter, model, entrepreneur and actress

History
Dol Said, 19th-century Malay leader of an area called Naning, which was then part of Malacca on the Malay Peninsula.
Ee Tiang Hong, Malayan poet of Chinese ancestry.
Hang Jebat, closest companion of the legendary Malaccan hero Hang Tuah.
Hang Li Po, fifth wife of Malaccan Sultan Mansur Shah (reigned 1456 to 1477).
Hang Nadim, very young Malay boy of great ingenuity who saved Temasek, now called Singapore, from attack by shoals of a species of swordfish named todak; attacks which cost many indigenous Malays their lives.
Hang Tuah, legendary warrior who lived in Malacca during the reign of Sultan Mansur Shah in the 15th century.
Munshi Abdullah (Abdullah Abdul Kadir), Malayan writer, was a Malacca-born Indian munshi of Singapore and died in Jeddah, a part of the Ottoman Empire.
Panglima Awang (Enrique of Malacca), native of the Malay Archipelago who participated in the Portuguese explorer Ferdinand Magellan's mission in the 16th century to sail around the world.
Tan Sri Hajjah Zainon Munshi Sulaiman, historic Malaysian politician, teacher and an independence campaigner.
Tun Dato' Sir Tan Cheng Lock, (one of the founding fathers of modern Malaysia and the founder of the Malaysian Chinese Association).
Tun Ali of Malacca, fourth bendahara, or prime minister of the Malaccan Sultanate.
Tun Perak, fifth bendahara, a Malay rank similar to a prime minister, of the Sultanate of Malacca.
Tun Perpatih Putih, sixth bendahara of the Sultanate of Malacca.
Tun Mutahir of Malacca, bendahara of the Malaccan Sultanate. 
Tun Fatimah, well-known Malaysian heroine and daughter of Tun Mutahir the Malaccan bendahara who lived during the 16th century.

Politics
Betty Chew, wife to Lim Guan Eng, former Minister of Finance of Malaysia (2018-2020). 
Chua Tian Chang, Malaysian politician and former Member of Parliament for the Batu constituency in Kuala Lumpur, Malaysia from March 2008 to May 2018.
Dato' Seri Liow Tiong Lai, former Minister of Transport of Malaysia (2014-2018) and Minister of Health (2008-2013).
Datuk Wira Haji Ahmad Hamzah, Malaysian politician and is the Member of the Parliament of Malaysia for the Jasin constituency in the State of Malacca.
Devan Nair, Malacca-born third President of Singapore and appointed by Parliament on 23 October 1981.
Goh Leong San, Malaysian politician.
Kerk Kim Hock, Malaysian politician and the fourth secretary-general for the Democratic Action Party (DAP).
Koh Nai Kwong, Malaysian politician of the Malaysian Chinese Association (MCA).
Lai Meng Chong, Malaysian politician from the town of Machap Baru in Malacca state.
Mas Ermieyati Samsudin,  Malaysian politician.
Md Sirat Abu, Malaysian politician and a former Member of the Parliament of Malaysia for the Bukit Katil constituency in the state of Malacca.
Shamsul Iskandar Md. Akin, Malaysian politician.
Tan Siew Sin, son of Tun Dato' Sri Tan Cheng Lock, Malaya's (later Malaysia's) first Minister of Commerce and Industry, Finance Minister for 15 years, and third president of the Malayan Chinese Association (MCA, later Malaysian Chinese Association), a major component party of Alliance and later National Front (BN) coalition.
Tan Sri Datuk Seri (DR.) Abu Seman Yusop, Member of the Parliament of Malaysia for the Masjid Tanah constituency in the state of Malacca from 2004 to 2013.
Tun Abdullah Mohd Salleh, 5th Chief Secretary to the Government of Malaysia, serving as Chief Secretary from 1 October 1976 to 31 December 1978.
Tan Sri Abdul Rahim Thamby Chik, Malacca Chief Minister (1982-1994).
Datuk Seri Haji Mohd Zin Abdul Ghani, Malacca Chief Minister (1994-1997).
Allahyarham YAB Datuk Seri Abu Zahar Ithnin, Malacca Chief Minister (1997-1999).
Tun Seri Setia Haji Mohd Ali Rustam, Yang di-Pertua Negeri of Melaka (2020-now) and Malacca Chief Minister (1999-2013). Malacca River Cruise which is also known as Venice of the East was inspired by him. His contribution of ideas also in the construction of Malacca Straits Mosque and Taming Sari Tower.
Datuk Seri Utama Ir. Haji Idris Haron, Malacca Chief Minister (2013-2018). He has been leading the project to redevelop Big Island starting with electricity supply to the Big Island and upgrading Sekolah Menengah Agama Dan Tahfiz Al-Quran Pulau Besar Melaka In March 2018, Datuk Seri Utama Ir. Idris Haron has been awarded the Malacca State Sports Icon Award.
Haji Adly Zahari, Malacca Chief Minister (2018-2020).

Sports
Amirul Hadi, Malaysian former professional football player.
Azman Adnan, former Malaysian footballer.
Badrul Hisyam Abdul Manap, Malaysian competitive runner.
Ching Hong Aik, Malaysian former footballer.
Datuk Rabuan Pit, former Asian sprint king.
Dollah Salleh, former footballer and football coach.
Elena Goh Ling Yin, Malaysian race walker.
Farderin Kadir, Malaysian footballer who mainly plays as a striker but can also plays as an attacking midfielder for Melaka United.
Goh Liu Ying, Malaysian professional badminton player.
Goh Soon Huat, badminton player from Malaysia.
Julia Wong Pei Xian, badminton player from Malaysia.
Khairul Hafiz Jantan, Malaysian sprinter.
Lim Teong Kim, retired Malaysian football player and formerly an assistant coach of Bayern Munich U-19 Team.
Mirnawan Nawawi, former field hockey player.
Mohd Suffian Abdul Rahman, Malaysian former football player.
Mohizam Shah Dawood Shah, Malaysian former football player.
Norhafiz Zamani Misbah, Malaysian professional footballer who plays as centre-back.
Norizam Ali Hassan, Malaysian former footballer who played as striker.
Ong Kim Swee, Malaysian football manager and former footballer.
Robert Braddell, historic English cricketer.
See Kok Luen, Malaysian footballer who currently plays for Melaka United FC in the 2020 Malaysia M3 League.
Shukor Adan, Malaysian footballer who is currently playing for Kuala Lumpur.
Soh Chin Aun, Malaysian national football player from Malacca alongside the late Mokhtar Dahari and R. Arumugam.
YH Dato' Sri Mohamad Norza Zakaria, President of Olympic Council of Malaysia (OCM) and also hold the post of President of Commonwealth Games Association of Malaysia.

Others
Abdul Razak Mohd Yusof, police senior officer, martial artist and one of the national heroes from the Royal Malaysia Police 69 Commando of the Pasukan Gerakan Khas.
A. Samad Said, novelist and poet.
Danny Lim, Malaysian writer, journalist and photographer.
Sukumari Sekhar, women's and children's rights activist.

See also

Portuguese East Indies
British Straits Settlements
Malaysia

References

Citations

Sources 

 
  Iberians in the Singapore-Melaka Area and Adjacent Regions (16th to 18th Centuries)
 The Singapore and Melaka Straits: Violence, Security and Diplomacy in the 17th Century
 Journal, Memorial and Letters of Cornelis Matelieff de Jonge. Security, Diplomacy and Commerce in 17th-Century Southeast Asia.

 
 
 
 
 "Popular History of Thailand" by M.L. Manich Jumsai, C.B.E., M.A.

External links 

 Official Melaka Tourism Action Council website
 Official Malacca government website
 Malacca Tourist Attraction
 Tourism Malaysia – Melaka
 Malacca Guide

 
Peninsular Malaysia
States of Malaysia
States and territories established in 1948
1948 establishments in British Malaya
Strait of Malacca